This is a list of members of the Victorian Legislative Assembly from 1947 to 1950, as elected at the 1947 state election:

 On 15 May 1948, the Liberal member for Toorak, Robert Bell Hamilton, died. Liberal candidate Edward Reynolds won the resulting by-election on 19 June 1948.
 On 10 October 1948, the Labor member for Geelong, Fanny Brownbill, died. Liberal candidate Edward Montgomery won the resulting by-election on 13 November 1948.
 On 16 November 1948, the Labor member for Prahran, Bill Quirk, died. Labor candidate Frank Crean won the resulting by-election on 22 January 1949.
 On 14 May 1949, the Labor member for Brunswick, James Jewell, died. Labor candidate Peter Randles won the resulting by-election on 16 July 1949.
 On 31 October 1949, three members resigned to contest seats at the 1949 election and by-elections were held on 17 December 1949 to fill the vacancies.
 Jack Cremean, the Labor member for Clifton Hill, contested and won Division of Hoddle. Labor candidate Joseph O'Carroll was elected in his stead.
 Wilfrid Kent Hughes, the Liberal member for Kew, contested and won Division of Chisholm. Liberal candidate Arthur Rylah was elected in his stead.
 Stan Keon, the Labor member for Richmond, contested and won Division of Yarra. Labor candidate Frank Scully was elected in his stead.
 On 14 April 1950, the former Premier of Victoria and Country Party member for Korong, Sir Albert Dunstan, died. No by-election was held due to the proximity of the 1950 election.

Sources
 Re-member (a database of all Victorian MPs since 1851). Parliament of Victoria.

Members of the Parliament of Victoria by term
20th-century Australian politicians